Jailbait is a 2004 psychodrama film written and directed by Brett C. Leonard.  It stars Stephen Adly Guirgis and Michael Pitt and is set in an unnamed prison in California.  The film received numerous independent film nominations and was awarded the Lake Placid Film Festival Grand Jury Prize.

Plot
Randy (Pitt), a 20-year-old convict, is taken to his cell by a Correctional Officer (David Zayas). He is greeted by his new cellmate, Jake (Guirgis), a veteran prisoner serving a life sentence.  Randy explains that he is serving 25 years for spray painting his neighbor's Mercedes-Benz.

The next morning, Jake begins telling Randy a story about the worst sexual encounter he ever had.  The story terrifies Randy, who begins to realize that Jake's motive may be more than just friendship.  The conversation turns toward how Jake feels homosexuality is a state of mind. The breakfast bell rings and the story is interrupted, much to Randy's relief.  Jake seems to drop the topic and return to his more friendly demeanor.  However, Randy is quickly brought back to the horrible reality of his situation when Jake forces him to wear his shirt in a feminine style and to hold his hand as they go to lunch (See prison sexuality).

Several months later, Randy's mother (Laila Robins) visits him at the prison. Randy lies to her and says his cell mate and he are getting along well. The brief visit only highlights Randy's isolation, as his mother is powerless to do anything to help him.

Moments later, Jake again prods the now bruised and bloody Randy to tell him about his "worst fuck."  Randy tells Jake about his first sexual experience: he was 17 and drunk in a Tijuana strip club, and paid a stripper $35 for oral sex in a room above the dance floor. Afterwards, he saw the same stripper perform a striptease in which she revealed that she was a pre-operational transsexual. Randy then tells Jake that he "thought that was the worst it was ever going to get," insinuating that his current situation as Jake's sex slave is far worse. Jake appears angry and offended, but then seems guilt ridden.  Again, Jake snaps out of his more tender feelings and, replacing them with cruelty, forces Randy to perform oral sex on him.  Afterward, Jake makes pleasant conversation as Randy lies in the fetal position in his bunk.

That night, as Jake sleeps, Randy creeps silently to his cellmate's bedside, preparing to stab him in the throat with a pencil as the older man sleeps.  Randy hesitates and Jake wakes up.  Jake doesn't attempt to physically restrain Randy, but instead tells him that he doesn't have the heart to kill a man in cold blood, and that even if he did he wouldn't kill him. Jake tells Randy that he is all that Randy has, that he is his protection, alluding perhaps to an even more brutal sexual slavery among other inmates were he not tied down to Jake.  He sincerely tells Randy that he is his only friend. Jake then tells Randy to go back to his bed and think about all the things he will do when he is finally released.

Jake then tells the now nearly tearful Randy why his mother stopped writing back; she had died and no one told him. The prison authorities had refused to let him go to his mother's funeral.  Jake then tells Randy to make sure that he gets to see his mother's funeral, that it is very important to be able to say goodbye.

Cast
 Stephen Adly Guirgis as Jake
 Michael Pitt as Randy
 Laila Robins as Mother
 David Zayas as Guard
 Eric Trosman as Prison Guard
 Brian Albanese as Prisoner
 Brad Lee Wind as Skinhead
 Ray Wineteer as Prisoner

See also
 Prison Sexuality
 Three Strikes Law
 Mandatory Sentencing
 Michael Pitt

References

External links
 
 

2004 films
2004 drama films
American drama films
American prison films
2000s English-language films
2000s American films